Nina Mytrofanivna Matviyenko, a Ukrainian singer, People's Artist of Ukraine.

Life and career 
Matviyenko was born on 10 October 1947 in village of Nedilyshche, Yemilchyne Raion, Zhytomyr Oblast at the time in the Ukrainian SSR in the Soviet Union (today - Ukraine). She was the fifth of eleven siblings, her mother was Antonina Ilkovna and father, Mitrofan Ustinovich. She began at a local residential school, then worked as a copyist and then a crane-operator's assistant. She completed her studies in Ukrainian philology at the Kyiv University in 1975. She had previously entered the vocal studio of the Ukrainian State Folk Choir named after Hryhory Veriovka in 1968, before becoming a soloist. She married Peter Gonchar and had three children: Ivan, who later joined a monastery, Andrey and Antonina; she later divorced him. 

In 1988 she received the Shevchenko National Prize, a Ukrainian State prize named after Taras Shevchenko, and also acted in Yuri Ilyenko's Ukraine war drama film Solomennye Kolokola.

Her repertoire includes numerous Ukrainian folk songs. Nina is the first performer of works by the composers Yevhen Stankovych, Myroslav Skoryk, Iryna Kyrylina, Hanna Havrylets and many others. She has performed on television in numerous films and on radio.

From 1966-1991 she was a soloist of the Ukrainian State Folk Choir. From 1968 a member of the folk trio "Zoloti kliuchi". In recent times she has been performing with the Kyiv Camerata orchestra, and the Kostyantyn Chechenya Early Music Ensemble.

Matviyenko has performed in Mexico, Canada, the United States, Czechoslovakia, Poland, Finland, Korea, France, Latin America. She has numerous recordings of Ukrainian folk songs.  Her life and philosophy of female equality was inspiration for singer, Yuliana Prado. In 2009, she published a book (of about 250 folk songs), about her life and career, and her love of the 'soul music' of her native land. In reviewing her work, the academic Mykola Zhulynsky from the National Academy of Sciences of Ukraine, and the Taras Shevchenko Institute of Literature described Matviyenko as someone who 'lives by songs and relishes in the song-making process, in her affinity with the song, opening for it her own soul and for the soul of the Ukrainian people after the shadows of servitude.'

During the 2022 Russian invasion of Ukraine, her performance of Yevhen Stankovych’s opera-ballet When the Fern Blooms, which had originally premiered in 2017 after a ban during the Soviet era, was live-streamed by the Lviv National Opera was re-released online.

Awards 

 1988 Taras Shevchenko Prize of Ukraine
 1996 International M. A. Kasyan Prize Fund – Order of Mykola Chudotvorets
 1997 Ukraine Order of Princess Olga, the 3d degree
 2017 Person of the Year

Discography 
 

 Nina Matvienko: Kolyskova zori. (Lullaby to a evening-glow)
 Nina Matvienko: Molytva (Prayer)
 Nina Matvienko: Osin', tkak myla. Golden Collection. (Autumn, So Nice)

 Ancient Music Ensemble of Kostjantin Chechenja, Nina Matvienko. Vsyakomu Horodu Nrav i Prava.  (Every City to Have Its Habits and Laws)

and Nina Matvienko: recording for World Folk Vision 2020 

and Nina Matviyenko book 'Oi, vyoriu nyvku shyrokuiu (I’ll Plow a Broad Furrow)'

References

1947 births
Living people
People from Zhytomyr Oblast
21st-century Ukrainian women singers
Ukrainian folk singers
Recipients of the title of Hero of Ukraine
Recipients of the Shevchenko National Prize
Taras Shevchenko National University of Kyiv alumni
20th-century Ukrainian women singers